Gurullés is one of 28 parishes (administrative divisions) in the municipality of Grado, within the province and autonomous community of Asturias, in northern Spain.

The population is 281 (INE 2007).

Villages and hamlets
Bellota
La Caborna
Casas del Monte
Las Ordaliegas
Campamojada
La Garaba 
Reconco
San Martín
San Pelayo de Sienra
Sobrepeña
Somines
La Tejera
Vega de Peridiello

References

Parishes in Grado